Madoussou Fall (born 17 March 1998) is a French rugby union player who plays for Stade Bordelais and the France women's national rugby union team.

Career
The daughter of international basketball player Fatoumata Traoré, Fall had to choose between basketball and rugby and ultimately opted for rugby because she found it more enjoyable, even though her family was very basketball orientated. In 2021, Fall left her club Bobigny, in Paris, to join Stade Bordelais and in her first season they reached the French play-offs for the first time in their history. She has been described as France’s "lethal weapon", and after overcoming an injury setback, by the Women's Six Nations Championship of 2022 she had established herself as a regular starter in the national side. She won player of the match for her performance in a French 39-6 win at the Stade des Alpes in Grenoble against Italy, being described as a "menace with the ball in hand". She was one of three players nominated for the award of “Best French international for the 2021-2022 season”, along with Laure Sansus, and Emilie Boulard, with the award ultimately going to Sansus. Fall was named in France's team for the delayed 2021 Rugby World Cup in New Zealand.

References

1998 births
Living people
French female rugby union players